Lee James Gaze (born 21 May 1975 in Pontypridd, Wales) is a Welsh musician. He is the lead guitarist, and also one of the founding members, of the Welsh/American alternative rock band No Devotion and previously a member of the Welsh rock band Lostprophets.

Early life
Gaze was born in Pontypridd and grew up on a council estate in the Pontypridd village Rhydyfelin. He did not do well at school as he was more interested in playing thrash metal: as he told Kerrang! in 2006, "Before I discovered music, I was a total delinquent, and then Iron Maiden changed my life. I had just been listening to pop before that. A friend of mine got hold of a tape and played to me and we got obsessed." He was also a huge fan of Megadeth, Metallica and Slayer.

Career
In 1991, Gaze formed his first band. They recorded one demo, Discontent and in 1994 they joined forces with two other local musicians and formed Fleshbind. The band recorded three demos and saw some success in their three-year career, including playing a show for Metal Hammer at the London Astoria.
Tired with the lack of direction, Gaze and Watkins disbanded Fleshbind and formed Lostprophets alongside Mike Chiplin on drums, later recruiting Mike Lewis, Stuart Richardson and Jamie Oliver. Gaze was the lead guitarist and one of the band's key songwriters.
Lostprophets disbanded in October 2013 after Watkins was arrested, and then jailed for 29 years. The remaining members later formed a new band, No Devotion, with Geoff Rickly as lead singer. The band have recently been working on their second album.

Personal life
Gaze began dating Malaysian communications specialist and a former member of Malaysian girl group, M'Steen, Syirin Said in 2011 and they were married in 2015. The couple have two sons. Together they ran a coffee shop in Hackney called Silhouette. It was voted one of the five best new cafés in London by the Financial Times.

Discography

References

1975 births
Living people
People from Pontypridd
Welsh guitarists
Welsh rock musicians
Welsh rock guitarists
Lead guitarists
Lostprophets members
21st-century British guitarists
No Devotion members